ISO/IEC JTC 1/SC 2 Coded character sets is a standardization subcommittee of the Joint Technical Committee ISO/IEC JTC 1 of the International Organization for Standardization (ISO) and the International Electrotechnical Commission (IEC), that develops and facilitates standards within the field of coded character sets. The international secretariat of ISO/IEC JTC 1/SC 2 is the Japanese Industrial Standards Committee (JISC), located in Japan. SC 2 is responsible for the development of the Universal Coded Character Set (ISO/IEC 10646) which is the international standard corresponding to the Unicode Standard.

History
ISO/IEC JTC 1/SC 2 was established in 1987, originally with the title “Character Sets and Information Coding,” with the area of work being, “the standardization of bit and byte coded representation of information for interchange including among others, sets of graphic characters, of control functions, of picture elements and audio information coding of text for processing and interchange; code extension techniques; implementation of these coded representations on interchange media and transmission systems." The standardization activities of the subcommittee were originally under the jurisdiction of ISO/TC 97. However, when the Joint Technical Committee, ISO/IEC JTC 1, was established in 1987 as a merger between ISO/TC 97, Information Technology, and IEC/TC 83, the standardization activity was transferred to the new subcommittee, ISO/IEC JTC 1/SC 2. Certain standards that are now under the jurisdiction of the ISO/IEC JTC 1/SC 2, such as ISO/IEC 646, were published before the creation of ISO/IEC JTC 1, under ISO/TC 97. The original working groups of ISO/IEC JTC 1/SC 2 were: WG 1 “Code Extension Techniques,” WG 2 “Multiple-octet Coded character set,” WG 3 “7-bit and 8-bit Codes,” WG 6 “Control Functions,” and WG 8 “Coded Representation of Picture and Audio Information.” Since then, the subcommittee has established or disbanded working groups in response to changing standardization needs within the field of coded character sets.

Scope and mission
The scope of ISO/IEC JTC 1/SC 2 is “Standardization of graphic character sets and their characteristics, including:”
 String ordering
 Associated control functions and their coded representation for information interchange 
 Code extension techniques

The scope of ISO/IEC JTC 1/SC 2 does not include audio and picture coding.

Structure
ISO/IEC JTC 1/SC 2 has one active working group (WG) which carries out specific tasks in standards development within the field of coded character sets.  The focus of this WG is described in the group’s terms of reference. The one active WG of ISO/IEC JTC 1/SC 2 is:

The discontinuation of ISO/IEC JTC 1/SC 2/OWG-SORT was unanimously approved by resolution at the 2014 plenary meeting of ISO/IEC JTC 1/SC 2. The project, ISO/IEC 14651, which was allocated to ISO/IEC JTC 1/SC 2/OWG-SORT is now handled directly under ISO/IEC JTC 1/SC 2.

Collaborations
ISO/IEC JTC 1/SC 2 works in close collaboration with a number of other organizations or subcommittees, both internal and external to ISO or IEC. Organizations internal to ISO or IEC that collaborate with or are in liaison to ISO/IEC JTC 1/SC 2 include:
 ISO/IEC JTC 1/SC 22, Programming languages, their environments and system software interfaces
 ISO/IEC JTC 1/SC 29, Coding of audio, picture, multimedia and hypermedia information
 ISO/IEC JTC 1/SC 34, Document description and processing languages
 ISO/IEC JTC 1/SC 35, User interfaces
 ISO/TC 37/SC 2, Terminographical and lexicographical working methods
 ISO/TC 46/SC 4, Technical interoperability
 ISO/TC 211, Geographic information/Geomatics
 ISO/TC 215, Health informatics

Some organizations external to ISO or IEC that collaborate with or are in liaison to ISO/IEC JTC 1/SC 2 include:
 Consultative Committee for Space Data Systems (CCSDS)
 Internet Engineering Task Force (IETF)/Internet Society (ISOC)
 International Telecommunication Union - Telecommunication Standardization Sector (ITU-T)
 Commission of European Communities (EC|CEC)
 United Nations Conference on Trade and Development (UNCTAD)
 United Nations Economic Commission for Europe (UN-ECE)
 World Intellectual Property Organization (WIPO)
 World Meteorological Organization (WMO)
 Taipei Computer Association (TCA)
 UC Berkeley
 Unicode Consortium
 W3C

Member countries
Countries pay a fee to ISO to be members of subcommittees.

The 25 "P" (participating) members of ISO/IEC JTC 1/SC 2 are: Austria, Canada, China, Finland, France, Germany, Greece, Hungary, India, Indonesia, Ireland, Japan, Kazakhstan, Democratic People’s Republic of Korea, Republic of Korea, Lithuania, Mongolia, Norway, Poland, Russian Federation, Serbia, Sri Lanka, Ukraine, United Kingdom, and United States of America.

The 24 "O" (observing) members of ISO/IEC JTC 1/SC 2 are: Armenia, Belgium, Bosnia and Herzegovina, Cuba, Czech Republic, Egypt, Ghana, Hong Kong, Iceland, Islamic Republic of Iran, Israel, Italy, Malaysia, Morocco, Netherlands, Pakistan, Romania, Slovenia, Sweden, Switzerland, Thailand, Tunisia, Turkey, and Viet Nam.

P members are obliged to participate in ballots on standards developed by SC 2. O members may comment on ballots, but are not allowed to vote.

Published standards
ISO/IEC JTC 1/SC 2 has published 55 ISO standards within the field of Coded Character Sets, including:

Standards under development within ISO/IEC JTC 1/SC 2 include amendments to the ISO/IEC 10646 standard (covered by ISO/IEC JTC 1/SC 2/WG 2) and amendments to the ISO/IEC 14651 standard (covered by ISO/IEC JTC 1/SC 2).

See also
 ISO/IEC JTC 1
 List of ISO standards
 Japanese Industrial Standards Committee
 International Organization for Standardization
 International Electrotechnical Commission

References

External links 
 ISO/IEC JTC 1/SC 2 page at ISO

002